Leland Swint McClung (1910–2000) was an American bacteriologist with an international reputation for his research on anaerobic bacteria.

McClung graduated from the University of Texas with a B.A. in 1931 and from the University of Wisconsin with an M.A. in 1932 and a Ph.D. in 1934. From 1936 to 1937 he was an instructor in bacteriology and a junior bacteriologist at the Experiment Station, University of California. From 1937 to 1940 he was an instructor in research medicine at the George Williams Hooper Foundation for Medical Research, University of California. At Indiana University he was a full professor and the head of the department of bacteriology from 1940 to 1965, when he retired as professor emeritus. In 1943 he recruited Salvador Luria for the department.

Selected publications

References

1910 births
2000 deaths
University of Texas alumni
University of Wisconsin–Madison alumni
Indiana University faculty
American bacteriologists
American medical researchers
People from Atlanta, Texas